Private Affair, Private Affairs or variants thereof may refer to:

Films
A Private Affair (1993 film), a 1993 Italian film with Rupert Graves
A Private Affair (2002 film), a 2002 French thriller with Marion Cotillard
Private Affairs (1925 film), an American silent drama film
Private Affairs (1940 film), an American comedy starring Nancy Kelly
Private Affairs (1987 film) (Ti presento un'amica), an Italian comedy drama directed by Francesco Massaro

Television
A Private Affair (2022 TV series), a 1940s Spanish detective drama
"Private Affair", a 1991 episode of Major Dad
"Private Affair", a 2002 episode of All Saints
"A Private Affair", a 1956 episode of Captain Gallant of the Foreign Legion

Music
Private Affair (Kyla album), a 2010 Tagalog and English album by Kyla
"Private Affair", from the 1978 album Eternally Yours by The Saints
"Private Affair", from the 1990 album Eyes Don't Lie by Donny Osmond
"A Private Affair", from the 1998 album Alchemy by Leah Andreone
"Private Affair", from the 1999 album Peculiar Situation by Earl Klugh
"Private Affair", from the 2008 album The Virgins by The Virgins

Novels
A Private Matter (novel), a 1963 Italian wartime novel by Beppe Fenoglio

See also
Her Private Affair, a 1929 film
A Private's Affair, a 1959 film
A Very Private Affair, a 1962 French film
"A Very Private Affair", an episode of the 1963-64 TV series The Lieutenant